HD 61330 (f Puppis) is a class B8IV (blue subgiant) star in the constellation Puppis. Its apparent magnitude is 4.53 and it is approximately 360 light years away based on parallax.

It is a multiple star, with a secondary component C, with magnitude 6.07 in an 81-year orbit with eccentricity 0.64. Another closer component, B, has been reported at 6.1 magnitude and 0.1" separation, but subsequent observers have repeatedly failed to confirm it.

References

Puppis
B-type subgiants
Double stars
Puppis, f
CD-34 3755
037096
2937
061330